Deborah Gelisio (born 26 February 1976) is a former Italian sport shooter who won a silver medal in Double trap at the 2000 Summer Olympics.

Biography
In career she won also five medals at ISSF World Shooting Championships.

See also
Italian sportswomen multiple medalists at Olympics and World Championships

References

External links
 Profile of Deborah Gelisio on ISSF web site
 

Italian female sport shooters
Olympic shooters of Italy
Shooters at the 1996 Summer Olympics
Shooters at the 2000 Summer Olympics
Shooters at the 2008 Summer Olympics
Olympic silver medalists for Italy
1976 births
Living people
Shooters at the 2015 European Games
European Games competitors for Italy
Medalists at the 2000 Summer Olympics
Olympic medalists in shooting
21st-century Italian women